Laura Clemesha (born 21 January 1992) is a retired Australian netball player.

Career
Clemesha grew up in the south-eastern Queensland city of Toowoomba and attended private secondary school Downlands College, before moving to the Sunshine Coast for university and her netball career. She debuted for the Queensland Firebirds in the ANZ Championship competition in 2013 and was part of the team's back-to-back premiership successes in 2015 and 2016. After being utilised off the bench in those years, Clemesha was re-signed to a more high-profile role ahead of the 2017 season, replacing long-time captain Laura Geitz at goal keeper. She continued to play in that role for several years before announcing her retirement at the end of the 2019 season.

Clemesha came out as gay in 2017 in a piece for her local newspaper The Caboolture News.

References

External links
 Queensland Firebirds profile
 Suncorp Super Netball profile
 Netball Draft Central profile

1992 births
Living people
Australian netball players
Queensland Firebirds players
Netball players from Queensland
LGBT netball players
Australian Institute of Sport netball players
Australian Netball League players
Queensland Fusion players
Queensland state netball league players
Australian LGBT sportspeople